Tatsuma Ito was the defending champion, but lost to Dudi Sela in the quarterfinals.
Sela went on to win the title by defeating Alex Bogomolov Jr. 6–1, 6–4 in the final.

Seeds

Draw

Finals

Top half

Bottom half

References
 Main Draw
 Qualifying Draw

Busan Open Challenger Tennisandnbsp;- Singles
2013 Singles